Obaba is a 2005 Spanish drama film directed by Montxo Armendáriz, based on the  Bernardo Atxaga novel Obabakoak.

Cast 
 Pilar López de Ayala - Maestra
 Juan Diego Botto - Miguel
 Bárbara Lennie - Lourdes
 Eduard Fernández - Lucas
 Peter Lohmeyer - Ingeniero Werfell
 Héctor Colomé - Ismael
 Pepa López - Merche

See also 
 List of Spanish films of 2005

External links 

2005 drama films
2005 films
Spanish drama films
2000s Spanish films
Films directed by Montxo Armendáriz
2000s Spanish-language films